Ørum or Orum may refer to:

Places 
 Ørum (Sønderlyng), a parish and village in Viborg Municipality, Denmark
 Ørum, Brønderslev Municipality, a parish and small village in Brønderslev Municipality, Denmark
 Ørum Djurs, a parish and village in Norddjurs Municipality, Denmark
 Ørum Church (Norddjurs Municipality), a church in Denmark
 Ørum Church (Skive Municipality), a church in Denmark
 Orum, Nebraska, a community in the United States

People 
 Ian Orum (1955–2020), English rugby player
 John Orum (died 1430s), English academic
 Julia Anna Orum (1843-1904), American educator, lecturer, and author
 Tania Ørum (born 1945), Danish literary historian